HLL can have several meanings:

 High-level programming language, abbreviated to High-level Language.
 HLL Lifecare Limited (formerly Hindustan Latex Limited), an Indian Public Sector Undertaking
 Horo Records hll jazz series, e.g. hll 101-4
 Horizontal Life Line, used for  fall arrest
 HyperLogLog, algorithm for the count-distinct problem
 Hell Let Loose, multiplayer WWII first-person shooter video game